Surubalijora or Surubalijore  is a small river (Jora or Jore) located in the Subalaya area of Birmaharajpur subdivision of Subarnapur district of Odisha, India.
It is originating from a mountain and merging with Mahanadi river near Subalaya, Tebhapadar and Ambasarabhata. It had created a small delta at the meeting place. Near this delta, the land is fertile and farmers from nearby villages cultivate various vegetables.

The Odisha Bridge and Construction Corporation limited has constructed a bridge over Surubalijore near Subalaya and Kamira village. This bridge is playing a vital role in connecting various town viz. Rairakhol, Boudh, Subalaya, Birmaharajpur, Dharmasala, Sonepur and Sambalpur. it is the largest jore of Odisha.

References

Tributaries of the Mahanadi River
Rivers of Odisha
Rivers of India